William Lamb may refer to:

William Lamb, 2nd Viscount Melbourne (1779–1848), Prime Minister of the United Kingdom
William Lamb (sculptor) (1893–1951), Scottish artist
William Lamb (Confederate States Army officer) (1835–1909)
William Lamb alias Paniter (died 1550), Scottish author
William F. Lamb (1883–1952), principal designer of the Empire State Building
William Kaye Lamb (1904–1999), Canadian historian
 pseudonym of Storm Jameson (1891–1986), English journalist and author

See also
 William Lambe (disambiguation)